Stretford Grammar School is a grammar school located in Stretford, in the Trafford borough of Greater Manchester, England. It is located on a 15-acre plot in the heart of Stretford, Trafford.

Admissions
The school has a sixth form in addition to years 7 to 11. Almost two-thirds of the school's pupils are from minority ethnic backgrounds, and approximately 30% of all pupils have a first language other than English, significantly above the national average.

History
The first head master was Albert Dakin. The first foundation stone of the school was laid on 1 July 1927. The building was to cost £40,745, and was built by Lancashire County Council. The boys' school opened on 12 September 1928, being officially opened on 23 October 1928 by Eustace Percy, 1st Baron Percy of Newcastle, and was situated on Great Stone Road west of Lancashire's cricket ground. The girls' grammar school was called Stretford Girls' High School on Herbert Street which opened in 1923. In January 1941 the site of the girls' school was totally destroyed by bombing. Nearby Trafford Park produced important materials for the war, not least Rolls-Royce Merlin engines made at Ford's factory. A new girls' school was built on a different site near Longford Park and south of Edge Lane (A5145): the former site was turned into playing fields. The school was administered by the Stretford Divisional Executive of the Lancashire Education Committee. From April 1974, it was administered by Trafford Metropolitan Borough Council.

In 1959 at the boys' school, 18-year-old David Murray Jones of Urmston, a goalkeeper in a seven-a-side football match collapsed and died of a fractured skull. There was a meningitis outbreak at the former boys' school in December 1971.

Until its merger in 1986 with Stretford Grammar School for Boys, it had been known since 1960 as Stretford Grammar School for Girls (both schools change their name at the same time). The site of the boys' grammar school then became Stretford High School, a community secondary school.

In 1988 there were plans to build a CTC on the boys' school site, which were dropped. At the time of the merger, six secondary schools closed in Trafford, with the loss of 4,500 school places.

In 2012, the school announced a £250,000 project to renovate the school fields into a state-of-the-art sports facility. The current headteacher is Michael Mullins. The school has vastly improved under his leadership.

School crest
The school's crest is embroidered on blazers and jumpers. The original crest, designed by pupils in the late 1980s, consisted of a shield featuring a globe and books, with a fist clenching lightning, taken from the Stretford coat of arms. The motto beneath read "Power through Knowledge". That crest was replaced by a maroon circle containing the school's initials, in lower case: when the school was awarded Science College status in 2005, the logo was altered to include a symbolic atom above the initials. This logo is now defunct and has been replaced with a renewed version of the previous crest.

Academic performance
Academically the school exam results are above national averages, with 92% of pupils achieving A*–C in at least five GCSEs (including English and Mathematics). The school's value add score is below the local authority average. In March 2009, Stretford became the first grammar school in the UK to be placed under special measures, following a damning Ofsted report, which cited low level behaviour problems, inadequate teaching, and poor leadership and management. 
The action came weeks after the then headmaster, Peter Cookson, resigned after a period of extended sick leave. The school had been assessed as "satisfactory" in its March 2006 Ofsted report, and left Special Measures Status in March 2010. In 2012, two-thirds of students achieved the difficult target of 5A/A* grades; in addition a quarter of students achieved at least 10 grades at A/A*.

Notable former pupils

 David Acheson MBE MStJ 1997–2004
 Kay Adshead, actress and director
 Air Chief Marshal Sir Anthony Bagnall GBE, KCB, Station Commander of RAF Leuchars from 1987 to 1990, AOC of No. 11 Group RAF from 1994 to 1996, and Commander-in-Chief of RAF Strike Command from 2000 to 2001
 Alfred Bates, Labour MP for Bebington and Ellesmere Port from 1974 to 1979 (later Trafford MBC councillor from 1992 to 2000)
 Ahmad Benali - former Manchester City footballer
 Brenda Dean, Baroness Dean of Thornton-le-Fylde, trade unionist (left school at 16)
 Tony Lloyd, Labour MP for Stretford from 1983 to 1997 and Manchester Central from 1997, was a pupil from 1962 to 1969.
  Ernest Marples, Baron Marples, UK Conservative Minister of Transport from 1959 to 1964, and MP for Wallasey from 1945 to 1964. Marples was responsible for introducing parking meters, yellow no-parking lines and motorways.
 Adie Mike, footballer
 Ian McShane, actor
 Debbie Moore OBE, businesswoman
 John Mulkern CBE, JP, managing director and board member British Airports Authority 1977–1987, Chairman British Airports International 1978–82, President Western European Airports Association 1981–83
 Peter Noone, singer Herman's Hermits, 1959–64
 Prof John Tomlinson CBE, Professor of Education from 1985 to 1997 at the University of Warwick, Director of Education for Cheshire from 1972 to 1984, and Chairman of National Institute for Careers Education and Counselling (NICEC, and part of the Careers Research and Advisory Centre) 1985–89
 Brian Trueman, presented Screen Test in the early 1980s and worked with Cosgrove Hall Films, narrating 1970s and 1980s cartoons
 Rear-Admiral John Trythall OBE CB
 Sir Arnold Wolfendale, Astronomer Royal
 Frederick Hodcroft, Founding Fellow of St Cross, Oxford

References

External links
 Official website
 EduBase

Grammar schools in Trafford
Educational institutions established in 1928
1928 establishments in England
Stretford
Foundation schools in Trafford